"Get You in the Morning" is a song by Canadian group Crash Test Dummies and was the second and final single from their 1999 album Give Yourself a Hand. This song is the band's second single to feature Ellen Reid on lead vocals.

Track listing

 Get You In The Morning [Radio Edit]
 Party's Over
 Get You In The Morning [Extended Remix]

Music video

The music video for the song features Ellen Reid switching to various TV stations featuring the rest of the band doing various random acts.

Charts

1999 singles
Crash Test Dummies songs
Song recordings produced by Greg Wells
Songs written by Greg Wells
Songs written by Brad Roberts
1999 songs